Přísně tajné premiéry is a 1967 Czech comedy film directed by Martin Frič.

Cast
 Jiřina Bohdalová as Lida
 Lubomír Kostelka
 Jiří Sovák as Hudec
 Čestmír Řanda as Jech
 Vladimír Menšík as Matysek
 Jiří Němeček as Klikac
 Miloš Kopecký as Müller

References

External links
 

1967 films
1967 comedy films
1960s Czech-language films
Czechoslovak black-and-white films
Films directed by Martin Frič
Czech comedy films
1960s Czech films